Chromosome 16p12.2-p11.2 deletion syndrome is a gene deletion syndrome in the position 16p12.2-p11.2 of the human genome.

References 

Genes
Human proteins